Mitcham, formerly known as Mitcham Village, is an inner-southern suburb of Adelaide in the City of Mitcham.

History
Created as a village separate from Adelaide known as "Mitcham Village", it was ancillary to a sheep station at Brown Hill Creek belonging to the South Australia Company. Prior to British colonisation, the area was inhabited by the Kaurna, an Aboriginal people. A group of about 150 Kaurna formerly camped at "Wirraparinga", now Mitcham Reserve (known for many years as "Brown Hill Creek reserve"). The reserve area occupies what was used as the village green.

In August 1909, the Church of England's Orphan Home for Girls, established by Julia Farr and Mrs W. S. Douglas in Carrington Street in Adelaide city centre in 1860, moved to Fullarton Road, Upper Mitcham.

Governance 
The suburb is the seat of the Mitcham Council.

Mitcham is located in the federal electorate of Boothby and the state electorate of Waite, which both tend to be safe Liberal seats.

Notable residents 
Theodore Ambrose (1880–1947) medical practitioner
Major Rupert Downes (1885–1945) surgeon and soldier
Hedley Herbert Finlayson (1895–1991) conservationist and mammalogist
John Harvey Finlayson (1843–1915) newspaper editor
Laura Margaret Hope (1868–1952) medical practitioner
Doris Egerton Jones (1889–1973) writer
Ellen Thornber (1851–1947) schoolmistress
Joseph Garnett Wood (1900–1959) botanist

Gallery

References 

Suburbs of Adelaide